, titled as Sullivan Bluth Presents: Dragon's Lair on the cover art and in-game as Sullivan Bluth's Dragon's Lair or Don Bluth's Dragon's Lair, is a cinematic platform video game developed by Motivetime and published by CSG Imagesoft for the Nintendo Entertainment System. Based on the LaserDisc game of the same name, it is identical plotwise to the original.

Gameplay 
The game is a side-scroller with the character walking slowly. Dirk can walk, crawl, or jump forward, and he has an array of weapons that he can discover and use to dispose of enemies. The controller layout is reversed from other mainstream NES titles, with Select functioning as the Pause button while Start is used for the Candle object (which helps reveal hidden weapons). Also, B is used for jumping, and A for attacking (the input of the A & B buttons is almost always the opposite in similar NES games). In the Japanese version, the controls have been altered; the Up button jumps while the B button uses the candle.

Areas and levels 

There are seven areas of the castle and four main levels of play:
 The Drawbridge
 The Entrance Hall (Level 1)
 The Treasury
 The Elevator Shaft
 The Gold Mines (Level 2)
 The Hall of the Grim Reaper (Level 3)
 Singe's Cavern (Level 4)
 The Lizard King's Throne Room (bonus level)

Regional differences 
PAL and Famicom versions have faster gameplay than the original North American release due to improved framerate. Both versions also use 256KB ROMs compared to the US's 128KB ROM. Furthermore, the PAL version has also additional enemies in The Entrance Hall level: spiders, flying insects, and a giant snake boss at the end; new death animation (when Dirk gets flattened); splash screens that appear as the player enters each level (beside The Dungeon stage); and The Elevator Shaft area has increased difficulty with added projectiles flying around, touching one is instant death. The Japanese and PAL versions play most of the songs faster. Also, a part of the ending theme was changed.

30 Life Code 
30 Life Code was added exclusively to the PAL and Japanese versions. It gives 30 lives after the player gains a high score, and then enters "BATS" as his name. The player will get the extra lives for the next game.

Reception 
The game was panned by critics and gamers alike due to its poor controls, trudging movement, and immense difficulty level. Gamers especially criticized the game for the player dying from one hit by any object or enemy, despite the player having an obvious health bar.

See also 
 List of video games notable for negative reception
 Nintendo hard

Notes

References

External links 
 
 

1990 video games
Cinematic platform games
Dark fantasy video games
Dragon's Lair
Epic/Sony Records games
Fantasy video games set in the Middle Ages
Mattel video games
Multiplayer and single-player video games
Nintendo Entertainment System games
Nintendo Entertainment System-only games
Video games about personifications of death
Side-scrolling platform games
Video games developed in the United Kingdom
Video games scored by Mark Cooksey
Video games with rotoscoped graphics